Linyou County is a county of Baoji, in the west of Shaanxi province, China, bordering Gansu province to the north and northwest. Linyou was first established over 2,200 years ago as Duyang County (杜阳县). The Sui dynasty Renshou Palace and Tang dynasty Jiucheng Palace were built in Linyou, of which archeological remains have been excavated. They were described by the famous poet Du Fu.

Nowadays Linyou is known for being the 'home of Boer goats' in China and for its walnut honey.

Administrative divisions
As 2020, Linyou County is divided to 7 towns.
Towns

Climate

See also 

 Ashina Jiesheshuai#Jiucheng Palace raid
 Emperor Wen of Sui, who commissioned the Renshou Palace

References

County-level divisions of Shaanxi
Baoji